The Plaza Hotel Buenos Aires is a five-star hotel located in the Retiro district, just steps from Calle Florida shopping area and overlooking the Plaza San Martín.

Overview
The Plaza was originally developed by local landowner and banker Ernesto Tornquist. Facing San Martín Square, the nine-story hotel was designed by German born architect Alfred Zucker and built at the northern end of Florida Street. The establishment was inaugurated as the Plaza Hotel on July 15, 1909, with the presence of President José Figueroa Alcorta. The hotel's developer, Ernesto Tornquist, had died in 1908, however.

Touted at the time as the finest hotel in South America, it was also its most modern. The original 160 rooms and 16 suites each had central heating and telephone access, and all were accessible via elevators. The hotel was wholly furnished at its outset by the prestigious London houses of Thompson & Company and Waring & Gillow. Marble sculptures by Gustav Eberlein of Germany and ceiling frescoes by Julio Vila y Prades of Spain added to the hotel's decor. Two new wings were added between 1942 and 1948, and additional work completed in 1977 brought the total number of rooms to nearly 400. The Philippine Embassy in Buenos Aires initially based itself out of the hotel when it opened in 1949.

The hotel was a part of the Inter-Continental Hotels chain from 1981 to 1982 and was briefly renamed the Plaza Inter-Continental. The Washington, DC-based Marriott Hotels Group assumed management of the hotel in 1994 for a period of 30 years while the property was still controlled by Tornquist's descendants. It was renamed the Marriott Plaza Hotel Buenos Aires. Following a US$10 million refurbishment, the establishment was awarded a five star rating.

The hotel today maintains 270 rooms and 48 suites. It received a facelift on the occasion of its 100th anniversary in 2009, celebrated with tours for the local people and a book retelling its fabulous and centennial history.

The hotel was sold in 2013 and returned to its historic name, the Plaza Hotel Buenos Aires.

The hotel closed April 29, 2017 for renovations. The architect and interior designer is Martín Zanotti.  Currently, the projected reopening date is in 2023.

Famous guests

Gallery

References and external links

Hotels in Buenos Aires
Hotel buildings completed in 1909